Sigrid Augusta Green (3 December 1920 – 12 October 2012) gathered intelligence in preparation for the sabotage of Telemark during the Second World War. She worked for the Norwegian Resistance and then at Bletchley Park.

She joined the Women's Auxiliary Air Force at the age of 22, attesting on 10 December 1942. Her bilingual ability from her Norwegian mother (Edith Stafford Green) was quickly recognised and she was seconded to the Norwegian Resistance. She was sent to Nazi-occupied Norway to research the Heavy water factory at Telemark. She was secretly landed in Norway by submarine as she refused to parachute.

References

1920 births
2012 deaths
People from Darwen
Women in World War II
Bletchley Park women
Bletchley Park people